Abram Wolfowitz Vaysbeyn, known as Boris Vaysbeyn (born 1927) is a Romanian-born Soviet and Moldovan architect. Born in Chișinău to a Jewish family, he graduated from the Odessa Institute of Civil Engineering in 1951 and worked at the Chișinău Design Institute "Moldgiprostroy". He participated in the planning of the Chișinău neighborhood of Budești. He designed numerous buildings with S.M. Shoikhet in Chișinău, including the State Bank (1972–1973), House of Culture of Railwaymen, College of Winemaking, and the Ministry of Agriculture building etc.

References

Literature
 Berkovich, Gary. Reclaiming a History. Jewish Architects in Imperial Russia and the USSR. Volume 4. Modernized Socialist Realism: 1955–1991. Weimar und Rostock: Grunberg Verlag. 2022 .

Moldovan architects
1927 births
Possibly living people
Architects from Chișinău
Moldovan Jews
Soviet architects